Indiana Jones and the Last Crusade is the soundtrack to Steven Spielberg's 1989 film of the same name. It was released by Wea in 1989. The music was composed and conducted by John Williams and performed by the Hollywood Studio Symphony Orchestra.

The official album only contains key moments from the film's score and is out of print. The expanded edition was officially released by Concord Music Group in a box set with the soundtracks of the other Indiana Jones films on November 11, 2008. Williams' arrangement of the Königgrätzer Marsch, the German military march that is played during the Berlin book burning scene, does not appear on the soundtrack. The soundtrack contains a variety of leitmotifs, such as for the Nazis, the Holy Grail and the returning Indiana Jones theme.

Track listing

Tracks do not appear in the order that they occur in the film, but instead in a succession chosen by Williams for listening purposes.  Listeners interested in hearing the selections in score order may program the album thus: 1, 2, 4, 5, 3, 6, 9, 10, 11, 12, 7, 13.

2008 Concord Album

For those interested in hearing the soundtrack in film order, the order is as follows:

1. Indy's Very First Adventure
2. The Boat Scene
3. Father's Study
4. X Marks the Spot
5. Ah, Rats!!!
6. Escape from Venice
7. Journey to Austria
8. Father and Son Reunited
9. Marcus Is Captured/To Berlin 
10. The Austrian Way
11. Alarm!
12. Scherzo for Motorcycle and Orchestra
13. To the Blimp
14. No Ticket
15. The Blimp Turns Around
16. Keeping Up With the Joneses
17. Brother of the Cruciform Sword
18. The Death of Kazim
19. On the Tank
20. Belly of the Steel Beast
21. The Canyon of the Crescent Moon
22. The Penitent Man Will Pass
23. The Keeper of the Grail
24. Wrong Choice, Right Choice
25. Finale/End Credits

References

Indiana Jones music
1989 soundtrack albums
1980s film soundtrack albums
Warner Records soundtracks
Albums with cover art by Drew Struzan
John Williams soundtracks